Cariaco is a town in the state of Sucre, Venezuela. It is the capital of the Ribero Municipality.  It stands a short distance up the Cariaco river and its port immediately on the coast is known as Puerto Sucre. It is at the head of the Gulf of Cariaco holding the Cariaco Basin.

References

Populated places in Sucre (state)